Mathematical Biosciences is a monthly peer-reviewed scientific journal publishing work that provides new concepts or new understanding of biological systems using mathematical models, or methodological articles likely to find application to multiple biological systems. Papers are expected to present a major research finding of broad significance for the biosciences, or mathematical biology. Mathematical Biosciences welcomes original research articles, letters, reviews and perspectives. 

The journal was established in 1967 and is published by Elsevier. The editor-in-chief is the mathematical and theoretical biologist Santiago Schnell from the University of Notre Dame.

Abstracting and indexing 
The journal is abstracted and indexed in:

According to the Journal Citation Reports, the journal has a 2021 impact factor of 3.935.

Bellman Prize 
The Mathematical Biosciences "Bellman Prize" is a biennial award to a research team or single investigator, whose Mathematical Bioscience article has made an outstanding contribution to their research field over the last five years. The deadline for submitting nominations for the Bellman Prize is April 1st of the year for which the prize is awarded. Nominations are accepted for any Mathematical Biosciences original research paper published four and five years before the nomination year cycle. The prize committee does not consider self-nominations, but anyone else can submit a nomination. 

The prize was established in 1985 and is named for Richard Bellman, the first editor-in-chief.

References

External links 
 

Mathematics journals
Biology journals
Monthly journals
Elsevier academic journals
Publications established in 1967
English-language journals